Open the Door is the third studio album by English musician Roger Hodgson. It was his first since 1987's Hai Hai, released May 9, 2000 on Epic Records.

Overview
Open the Door was recorded mostly in France and features mostly French musicians, many who have played on Excalibur (La Légende Des Celtes) also produced by Simon featuring contributions from Hodgson, as his backup band. This is Hodgson's only solo album to be partially recorded outside the United States.

Once again collaborating with Hodgson, former Yes guitarist and vocalist Trevor Rabin contributed electric guitar, keyboards and background vocals on "The More I Look". The song "Showdown" was performed live by Hodgson already in 1996 and a live version was released on his latest album Rites Of Passage. "Death and a Zoo" and "Say Goodbye" were performed live by Hodgson already in 1998.

Reception

Allmusic gave the album a positive review, calling it "the closest thing to Supertramp since ...Famous Last Words..." and praising the songwriting, particularly the unusual incorporation of French influences.

Track listing
All songs written by Roger Hodgson, except where noted.

"Along Came Mary" 6:24
"The More I Look" 4:57
"Showdown" 5:20
"Hungry" 4:27
"The Garden" 2:15
"Death and a Zoo" 7:32
"Love is a Thousand Times" 3:30
"Say Goodbye" 3:57
"Open the Door" 8:55
"For Every Man" (Roger Hodgson, Alan Simon) 4:43

Bonus track
"Danielle" – 3:15

Album chart
 France: # 30
 Switzerland: # 33
 Germany: # 74

Personnel
 Roger Hodgson - vocals, guitars (tracks 3, 4, 6, 10), 12-string guitar (tracks 1, 2, 7), bass guitar (track 8), keyboards (tracks 1–4, 6, 9), piano (track 6), harmonium (track 5), pipe organ (tracks 8, 9), harpsichord (track 8) church organ (track 11)
 Trevor Rabin - electric guitar, keyboards, backing vocals (track 2)
 Claude Samard - banjo, (track 3) Dobro slide guitar (tracks 3, 4), bouzouki (tracks 6, 7), pedal steel guitar (track 7), oud (track 9)
 Manuel Delgado - Spanish guitar (track 9), palmas (track 9)
 Dan Ar Braz - arpeggio guitar (track 10)
 Laurent Vernerey - bass guitar (tracks 1–5, 7, 9, 10)
 Alan Thomson - bass guitar (track 6)
 Arnaud Dunoyer - Hammond organ (tracks 1, 7, 9, 10)
 Olivier Rousseau - piano (tracks 2, 3)
 Alan Simon - high whistle (tracks 1, 6), bodhran (track 6), harmonica (track 9)
 Loïc Ponthieu - drums (tracks 1–5, 7, 9, 10)), wavedrum (track 9)
 Denis Banarrosh - percussion (tracks 1, 3–7, 9, 10)
 Gerry Conway - percussion (tracks 1, 6), drums (track 8)
 Jeff Phillips - drums (track 6)
 Jean Pierre Meneghin - Scottish drums (track 1)
 Gurvan Houdayer - Scottish drums (track 1)
 Christophe Negre - saxophone (1, 4, 10)
 Michel Gaucher - flute (track 9)
 Zdenek Rys - oboe (track 6)
 Bruno Le Rouzic - bagpipe (track 1)
 Pascal Martin - uilleann pipe (tracks 1, 6)
 Jean Louis Roques - accordion (tracks 1, 7, 10)
 Marco Canepa - Morse code (tracks 1, 10)
 Jean-Jacques Milteau - harmonica (track 3)
 Dominique Regef - rebec (track 5, 11), Hurdy Gurdy (track 6)
 Didier Lockwood - violin (tracks 3, 6, 8, 9)
 Pavel Belohlavek - cello (track 6)
 Ilana Russell (Alana Cunningham) - children's choir
 Sierrah Dietz - children's chorus (track 10)
 Justine Black - children's chorus (track 10)
 Molly Katwman - children's chorus (track 10)
 Nikki Matheson - backing vocals (track 11)
The Symphonic Orchestra of Prague; conducted by Mario Klemens (tracks 1, 2, 5, 6, 8-10)
The Bulgarian Voices "Philippopolis"; conducted by Hristo Arabadjiev (tracks 8, 9)
Samples from: speech by Queen Elizabeth II (track 1), Rev. Jesse Jackson (track 3), Ronald Reagan (track 3), Sevik the wolf (track 6)

References

2000 albums
Epic Records albums
Roger Hodgson albums
Albums produced by Roger Hodgson
Albums recorded in a home studio